Tai Tung is the oldest surviving Chinese restaurant in the International District of Seattle. It was opened in 1935 by an immigrant from Hong Kong. The restaurant is the subject of a 2015 documentary, A Taste of Home, and was a location for the 2020 film The Paper Tigers. The restaurant's cellar is said to be haunted by kuei (ghosts). It is known for being busy on Christmas Day, when most Seattle restaurants are closed.

See also 

 History of Chinese Americans in Seattle
 List of Chinese restaurants

References

Sources

Further reading

External links

1935 establishments in Washington (state)
Chinatown–International District, Seattle
Chinese restaurants in Seattle
Reportedly haunted locations in Washington (state)